Čaprazlije is a village in the city of Livno in Canton 10, the Federation of Bosnia and Herzegovina, Bosnia and Herzegovina. It is located 30km from Livno. It is located 5 km northwest of the village of Čelebić.  Čaprazlije is situated north of Rujan and south of Prova. Bosnian Croats lived on the side of the village along Rujan, and Bosnian Serbs lived on the side towards Provo. Currently, there are no permanent residents in the village.

History 

The earliest written mention of the village of Čaprazlije is by Dragičev in 1741. He was visiting Catholic villages in the Livanjsko Polje. Friar Grga Lozić wrote more about the village and claimed that the village was once called Skučani.  He wrote that the village was renamed after the death of beg Čaprazli at Brižina.
In some church documents, Čaprazlije is called Sarumiševo. There are other documents that use the word čep (meaning plug in Bosnian/Croatian/Serbian languages) in the name of the town.   During flooding, typically from October to March, springs in the area get blocked with debris and a plug is formed causing water to flood the surrounding land.

In 1768 amongst the inhabitants were 80 Catholics.  By 1813 the number of Catholics grew to 104.
In 1768 the following families were residing in Čaprazlije : Barać, Glavurdić, Grame, Bošković, Hrgović, Jukić, Kujundžija, Ljubičić, Odak, Smoljić, Tokić.

Demographics 

According to the 2013 census, its population was 51.

Footnotes

Bibliography 

 

Populated places in Livno